Mor Ndiaye (born 22 November 2000) is a Senegalese footballer who currently plays as a defensive midfielder for Estoril.

Career statistics

Club

Honours
Porto Youth
UEFA Youth League: 2018–19

References

2000 births
Living people
Senegalese footballers
Senegalese expatriate footballers
Association football midfielders
Liga Portugal 2 players
FC Porto B players
Primeira Liga players
G.D. Estoril Praia players
Expatriate footballers in Portugal
Senegalese expatriate sportspeople in Portugal